was an admiral in the Imperial Japanese Navy during World War II. He was commander of the Japanese 4th Fleet and later served as Vice-Minister of the Navy. A noted naval theorist, he was a strong advocate of naval aviation within the Japanese Navy. General (Prime Minister) Abe Nobuyuki was his brother-in-law.

Biography

Early life 
Shigeyoshi Inoue was born on December 9, 1889 in Sendai, Miyagi Prefecture, the eleventh son of a vineyard owner and former samurai retainer Kanori Inoue. His name Shigeyoshi, consisting of the kanji 成 (to achieve) and 美 (beauty), was derived from a passage in Analects by Yan Hui saying "The Master said, the man of virtue seeks to achieve the beautiful qualities of men and does not seek to achieve their bad qualities. The small man does the opposite of this". Shigeyoshi, who was taught by his father to become a man like this, took great pride in this name.

Early career
Inoue attended the 37th class of the Imperial Japanese Naval Academy, graduating second out of a class of 179 cadets in 1909. As a midshipman, he was assigned to the cruiser  on its 1909 cruise from Dairen to Chemulpo, Chinkai, Sasebo and Tsu. He stayed with Soya on its cruise the following year to Manila, Ambon, Townsville, Brisbane, Sydney, Hobart, Melbourne, Fremantle, Batavia, Singapore, Hong Kong, Makung, and Keelung. On his return, he was assigned to the battleship , and then the cruiser .

Overseas experience
Shortly after his promotion to ensign on December 15, 1910, he was reassigned to the cruiser  and attended the coronation ceremonies for King George V in London in 1911. In 1912, he returned to school to study latest naval artillery and submarine warfare techniques and was promoted to sub-lieutenant at the end of that year. In 1913, he served on the cruiser , followed by the battleship . He was promoted to lieutenant at the end of 1915, and transferred to the battleship . Although Fusō participated in operations in World War I against the Imperial German Navy, Inoue was not in any combat situations.

At the end of 1918, Inoue was appointed military attaché to Switzerland, and ordered by the Navy to learn German. In 1919, he was part of the Japanese diplomatic delegation to the Paris Peace Conference, where this knowledge proved to be useful. In 1920, he was appointed military attaché to France, and was then ordered to learn French. In December 1921, he received a promotion to lieutenant commander, and was permitted to return to Japan.

On December 1, 1925, he was promoted to commander. Inoue remained in staff positions for the next several years, including an appointment as naval attaché to Italy from 1927–1929, after which he was promoted to captain.

As admiral
On November 15, 1933, Inoue was given command of Hiei. However, his administrative talents could not be overlooked, and he returned to shore duties after slightly over a year and a half. Inoue was a protégé of Admiral Isoroku Yamamoto, and was strongly opposed to the Tripartite Pact with Fascist Italy and Nazi Germany. Inoue was a leader of the "leftist clique" within the Japanese military, which opposed Japan's increasing trend towards fascism and overseas expansionism.

Promoted to rear admiral on November 15, 1935, Inoue was made vice commander of the IJN 3rd Fleet, which covered the China theater of operations in 1939 and further promoted to vice admiral the same year. As with Yamamoto, he was a strong proponent of naval aviation. Inoue was awarded the Order of the Rising Sun (first class) in 1940.

In 1940, Inoue became commander of the Imperial Japanese Navy Aviation Bureau, and submitted his thesis for a radical restructuring of the Imperial Japanese Navy to Naval Minister Koshirō Oikawa early in 1941. He was highly critical of the Navy's shipbuilding programme, with its emphasis on battleships over aircraft carriers. Inoue was given command of the IJN Fourth Fleet later the same year, based out of Truk. He was thus in command of Japanese naval forces during the Battle of Guam and Battle of Wake Island. He subsequently relocated his headquarters to Rabaul for Operation Mo, intended to occupy Port Moresby. However, after the Japanese defeat at the Battle of the Coral Sea in May 1942, he was relieved of his command in October, and returned to Japan to become commander of the Imperial Japanese Naval Academy. He became Vice Minister of the Navy in the closing stages of World War II, was promoted to full admiral on May 15, 1945 (one of the last two promotions made to this rank), and officially retired on October 15 of the same year.

After the war, Inoue became an English and music teacher to children at his house in Yokosuka. The site of his home is now a public park.
However, this site was closed due to the 2011 Tohoku Earthquake.

His grave is at Tama Cemetery in Fuchū, Tokyo, Japan.

References

Further reading

 - Online views of selections of the book:

External links 

 – Translation of the official record by the Japanese Demobilization Bureaux detailing the Imperial Japanese Army and Navy's participation in the Southwest Pacific area of the Pacific War.

井上成美 

1889 births
1975 deaths
People from Sendai
Japanese admirals of World War II
Imperial Japanese Navy admirals
Japanese naval attachés